Club Recreativo Granada is a Spanish football team based in Granada, in the autonomous community of Andalusia. Founded in 1947, it is the reserve team of Granada CF and currently plays in Segunda Federación – Group 4, holding home games at Estadio Miguel Prieto, with a capacity for 2,500 spectators.

Unlike the English League, reserve teams in Spain play in the same football pyramid as their senior team, rather than a separate league. However, reserve teams cannot play in the same division as the main squad.

Reserve teams are also no longer permitted to enter the Copa del Rey. Additionally, only under-23 players or under-25 players with a professional contract can switch between senior and reserve teams.

History
Founded in 1947 as Recreativo de Granada, the team achieved a host of promotions and went on to feature several seasons in Tercera División.

On 30 June 2013, Granada B finally achieved his first promotion to Segunda División B, after a 1–2 defeat against Extremadura UD. The club had a good first season in the new category by finishing 6th among 20 teams. On 9 March 2018, Granada announced that the reserve team will carry the name of Club Recreativo Granada from 1 July.

In the 2018-19 season the club managed to save its position in the Segunda División B, having finished in the 14th position.

Season to season
As an independent club

As the reserve team of Granada CF

8 seasons in Segunda División B
2 seasons in Segunda Federación
29 seasons in Tercera División

Current squad
.

From Youth Academy

Out on loan

Current technical staff 

   Isaac Campos   José Miguel Funes

References

External links
Official website 
B-side on official website 
Futbolme team profile 
Club & stadium history  Estadios de España 

 

Granada CF
Spanish reserve football teams
Football clubs in Andalusia
Association football clubs established in 1947
1947 establishments in Spain